Kalki Jayanti is a Hindu festival that celebrates the future birth of Kalki, the final avatar of Vishnu, who is set to be born near the end of Kali Yuga to  eradicate vices, including Kali (male demon) and restore Dharma, turning the Wheel of Time to Satya Yuga. Kalki's birth ceremony is observed on the Dwadashi of the Shuklapaksha of the Bhadrapada month as per the traditional Hindu calendar, while in Gregorian calendar it is the twelfth day of the waxing phase of the moon.

Significance 

Kalki is set to be born in the village of Shambala, to a Brahmin-Kshatriya family, whose parents are Vishnuyasha (father) and Sumati (mother) or Awejsirdenee and Bishenjun. This event commences near the end of Kali Yuga, which is described that when Kalki grows up and becomes a trained warrior, he will ride on a divine white horse named Devadatta with a blazing sword, accompanied by a talking parrot, Shuka, who knows everything; the past, present and future. He then goes around the world to fight evil kingdoms and Kali, who is a demon that has the powers of a yogi to control beings and make them commit Adharma. He then restores Dharma and returns to his kingdom, and finally to Vaikuntha.

Celebration 
During the festival, the devotees wake up early in the morning and take a bath before sunrise The performance of the pooja (worship) starts with the Beej mantra. After the chanting, an offering of a seat (asana) to Kalki takes place. The idol is then washed with panchamrita as abhisek, with the offerings of flowers, diya and incense. 

During that period, recitation of the Shree Hari Stotram, Vishnu Sahastranam, Om Namo Bhagvate Vasudevaye and other mantras are carried out 108 times.  The worshippers would then perform Dana.

See also 

 Kalki
 Kalki Purana
 Dashavatara

References 

Hindu festivals in India
Vishnu
August observances